The West Indies women's cricket team played the New Zealand women's cricket team in March 2018. The tour consisted of three Women's One Day Internationals (WODIs) and five Women's Twenty20 Internationals (WT20Is). The WODI games were part of the 2017–20 ICC Women's Championship. New Zealand umpire Kathy Cross announced that she would retire from international umpiring at the end of the WT20I series.

New Zealand Women won the WODI series 3–0 and the WT20I series 4–0, after the fourth WT20I match was washed out.

Squads

Tour match

50-over match: Canterbury Women vs West Indies Women

WODI series

1st WODI

2nd WODI

3rd WODI

WT20I series

1st WT20I

2nd WT20I

3rd WT20I

4th WT20I

5th WT20I

References

External links
 Series home at ESPN Cricinfo

Women's international cricket tours of New Zealand
2017–20 ICC Women's Championship
2018 in West Indian cricket
2018 in New Zealand cricket
International cricket competitions in 2017–18
New Zealand 2018
cricket
2018 in women's cricket